The 1983 Junior League World Series took place from August 16–20 in Taylor, Michigan, United States. Manatí, Puerto Rico defeated Altamonte Springs, Florida in the championship game.

Teams

Results

Consolation round

References

Junior League World Series
Junior League World Series
Junior